Diana Reiter [Reiterówna] (November 6, 1902 – 1943) was a Polish architect of Jewish descent, one of the first female architects in Kraków. Born in Drohobycz, in 1927 she graduated from the Faculty of Architecture of Lviv Polytechnic. In the years 1928–1931 she worked in the Directorate of Public Works of the Provincial Office in Kraków with two other architects, Zdzisław Kowalski and Adam Moscheni. In the years 1930–1931 she was a technical officer, gave opinions on the designs of newly built buildings in Krynica and dealt with appeals against decisions of the Kraków construction authorities. At the request of the provincial conservator of monuments she dealt with the restoration of the royal castle in Niepołomice. Due to the economic situation, she was dismissed at the end of 1931. In 1932–1934 she worked in the office of Kazimierz Kulczyński, making architectural drawings.

In 1928, the project she worked on together with Zdzisław Kowalski and Adam Moscheni received the third place in the competition for the building of the Jagiellonian Library. In the years 1931–34 she was a member of the Union of Architects of the Kraków Province, renamed the Association of Architects of the Republic of Poland and the Union of Jewish Engineers (from 1937). Two buildings designed by her are extant: at Beliny-Prażmowskiego 26 (1933–1935) and Pawlikowskiego 16 (1937–1939) - a tenement house constructed for Józef and Eleonora Elsner.

From August 1940, she worked in the design office of Kazimierz Kulczyński and she lived with her mother at Królewska, until the creation of the ghetto in March 1941. She died two years later, a victim of the Kraków concentration camp.

Reiter was portrayed by Elina Löwensohn in the 1993 film Schindler's List, in which she is shot by Amon Goeth after an argument over the foundations of the barracks being built improperly.

References

1902 births
1943 deaths
Polish Jews
Polish women architects
Architects from Kraków
Jewish engineers
Lviv Polytechnic alumni
Polish expatriates in Ukraine
Polish people who died in Nazi concentration camps
People who died in Kraków-Płaszów concentration camp